Members of the New South Wales Legislative Council who served from 1932 to 1934 were appointed for life by the Governor on the advice of the Premier. This list includes members between the 1932 state election on 11 June 1932 and the introduction of an indirectly elected chamber on 22 April 1934. The President was Sir John Peden. The council had been flooded in 1931 raising the number of members from 85 to 110. The appointment of additional members in September 1932 raised the number of members of the council to an all-time peak of 125.

See also
Stevens ministry

References

Members of New South Wales parliaments by term
20th-century Australian politicians